William Roberts (18 March 1859 – 12 June 1945) was a Welsh footballer who played as a forward for Wrexham, Wrexham Olympic and Rhostyllen Victoria in the 1880s and made four appearances for Wales, scoring once. He was the brother of Bob Roberts who also played for the two Wrexham clubs and twice for Wales.

Football career
Roberts was "always in the thickest of the fight", and was described as "tricky and comical, and occasionally brilliant". His playing career came before the advent of League football and his greatest success at club level was in the Welsh Cup, where he scored the only goal in the final of the 1882–83 tournament, thus enabling Wrexham to defeat Druids and claim the trophy for the second time.

He and his brother, Bob, made their international debuts on 27 February 1886 against Ireland in the opening match of the 1886 British Home Championship. The match ended as a 5–0 victory for the Welsh, with Bill Roberts scoring the opening goal. After defeats against England and Scotland, Roberts was not called up for the February 1887 match against England. After an injury to Robert Mills-Roberts in the warm-up for that match (which Wales lost 4–0) the Roberts brothers were both recalled for the match against Ireland in March 1887, with Bob serving as an emergency goalkeeper. This match was the finale to the brothers' international careers with Bob conceding four goals.

International appearances
Roberts made four appearances for Wales in official international matches, as follows:

Career outside football
Roberts worked as coal-miner in his youth, but was later employed in a leather works.

Honours
Wrexham
Welsh Cup winners: 1883

References

1859 births
Footballers from Wrexham
1945 deaths
Welsh footballers
Association football forwards
Wrexham A.F.C. players
Wales international footballers
Rhostyllen Victoria F.C. players